Reşat Mursaloğlu (1915 – 21 December 1987) was a Turkish politician.

He studied at Ankara University, Law School, dropped out, however,  in his senior year. He worked as a farmer and merchant. He served as district mayor of İskenderun Municipality, and was a deputy of  Hatay Province from the Republican People's Party (CHP) in the 13th Parliament of the Grand National Assembly.

He was married and the father of three children.

Mursaloğlu died on 21 December 1987.

References

1915 births
People from Reyhanlı
Ankara University Faculty of Law alumni
Turkish farmers
Turkish merchants
Republican People's Party (Turkey) politicians
Local politicians in Turkey
Deputies of Hatay
Members of the 13th Parliament of Turkey
1987 deaths